János Hrutka (born 26 October 1974) is a Hungarian former professional footballer who played as a defender. He represented the Hungary national team internationally between 1998 and 2002.

He was a member of the 1. FC Kaiserslautern team which reached the quarter final of the UEFA Champions League in the 1998–99 season and won the Bundesliga in 1998.

Outside football
Hrtuka worked as an expert for the Hungarian sports channel Spiler TV. Hrutka was fired from the TV channel because he agreed with Hungarian national team and RB Leipzig footballer, Péter Gulácsi's opinion on gay marriage.

Persecution
Hrutka worked as a commentator and expert for the pro-government television sports channel Spíler TV from 2017 to 2021. After making pro-LGBT statements, he was fired in March 2021. Subsequently, the government media (Nemzeti Sport and FourFourTwo) began to revive his player contracts from the past twenty years, with the intention of expiration.

Career statistics
Scores and results list Hungary's goal tally first, score column indicates score after each Hrutka goal.

References

External links
 Profile at footmercato
 
 

1974 births
Living people
Hungarian footballers
Footballers from Budapest
Association football defenders
Hungary international footballers
Hungary under-21 international footballers
Nemzeti Bajnokság I players
Bundesliga players
Ferencvárosi TC footballers
MTK Budapest FC players
1. FC Kaiserslautern players
Vasas SC players
Budapest Honvéd FC players
Hungarian expatriate footballers
Hungarian expatriate sportspeople in Germany
Expatriate footballers in Germany